Pradeep Mathur (born 25 November 1955) is an Indian politician and former 4 time MLA from the Mathura constituency of Uttar Pradesh as a member of the Indian National Congress political party.

Early life and education
Pradeep Mathur was born in Delhi. He attended the Dr. Bhimrao Ambedkar University and attained Bachelor of Laws degree.

Political career
Pradeep Mathur has been a MLA for four terms. He represented the Mathura constituency and is a member of the Indian National Congress political party.

Posts held

See also

 Mathura
 Sixteenth Legislative Assembly of Uttar Pradesh
 Uttar Pradesh Legislative Assembly

References 

Indian National Congress politicians
Uttar Pradesh MLAs 1985–1989
Uttar Pradesh MLAs 2002–2007
Uttar Pradesh MLAs 2007–2012
Uttar Pradesh MLAs 2012–2017
People from Mathura district
1955 births
Living people